Agustín Senin (born 4 September 1946) is a Spanish boxer. He competed in the men's bantamweight event at the 1964 Summer Olympics. At the 1964 Summer Olympics, he lost to Law Hon Pak of Hong Kong.

References

1946 births
Living people
Spanish male boxers
Olympic boxers of Spain
Boxers at the 1964 Summer Olympics
Sportspeople from Bilbao
Bantamweight boxers